This is a list of solved missing person cases of people who went missing in unknown locations or unknown circumstances that were eventually explained by their reappearance or the recovery of their bodies, or the conviction of the perpetrator(s) responsible for their disappearances.

2000s

2010s

2020s

See also

 List of solved missing person cases: pre-2000
 List of kidnappings
 List of murder convictions without a body
 Lists of people who disappeared
 List of unsolved deaths
 Lists of unsolved murders

References

Disappeared
solved missing person cases
 
Missing person, solved, 2001–